Mount Brocoum is the dominant peak on the eastern ridge of the Columbia Mountains in Palmer Land. It was mapped by the United States Geological Survey in 1974, and named by the Advisory Committee on Antarctic Names for Stephan J. Brocoum and his wife, Alice V. Brocoum, Columbia University geologists who studied the structure of the Scotia Ridge area. He worked in 1968–69 and 1970–71; she, only the latter season.

References
 

Mountains of Palmer Land